The Central Mental Hospital is a mental health facility housing forensic patients in Portrane, Dublin, Ireland. The hospital, along with a community day centre for outpatients at Usher's Island, forms part of the National Forensic Mental Health Service.

History

The hospital opened as the Central Criminal Lunatic Asylum for Ireland at Dundrum, Dublin in 1850. This was an early move of an ideological initiative throughout the United Kingdom and its colonies which included the building of the infamous Broadmoor Hospital in England.  The site was originally chosen to be soothing to mental health patients and was intentionally not linked to any particular prison service to maintain the distinction between criminality and illness.

The Health Service Executive announced in February 2012 that the hospital would locate to the former site of the old St. Ita's Hospital in Portrane. The construction works were undertaken by Rhatigan OHL at a cost of €140 million. The new facility opened in November 2022.

Services
The hospital provides treatment in high, low, and medium-security conditions. Patients are referred by the courts, the prisons and local hospitals for both assessment and residential treatment.  The site is fully accredited by the Royal College of Psychiatrists for training purposes and provides intensive psychiatric treatment and rehabilitation. However, demand is greater than supply.

See also

St. Nahi's Church, Dundrum
Taney Parish

References

Psychiatric hospitals in the Republic of Ireland
Hospitals in Fingal
1850 establishments in Ireland